"Call Me Every Day" is a duet by American singer Chris Brown and Nigerian singer Wizkid, released by RCA Records as the third official single from Brown's tenth studio album, Breezy, on June 17, 2022.

Background and release
Brown and WizKid had previously collaborated on two songs: the 2016 remix of the song "Shabba", also featuring R&B singer Trey Songz and rapper French Montana, and the single "African Bad Gyal", contained in WizKid's 2017 album Sounds from the Other Side. In November 2021, Brown made an appearance on Wizkid's "Made in Lagos tour", performing his song "Go Crazy" in London, marking his first performance in the UK in 11 years, following the revocation of his ban from entering the country implemented in 2010. In June 2022, during an interview with radio host Big Boy, Brown said that him and WizKid share a longtime friendship relationship outside of music, and that they previously did various studio sessions together where he felt like they ended up doing "fun songs", but with "Call Me Every Day" he accomplished his desire of making a "real record" with the Nigerian artist. 

On June 10, 2022 Brown posted a snippet of "Call Me Every Day" on his Instagram account, in a video showing him and his dancing crew executing a choreography for the song, using moves, created by Jamaican dancehall dancers. The track was released seven days later as the album's official third single.

Composition
"Call Me Every Day" is a mid-tempo song with an Afrobeats flavor.

Critical reception
The song received positive reviews from music critics. HotNewHipHop praised the track for its summer vibe. Rap-Up wrote that the song's rhythm is "infectious". HipHop-N-More commended the song's "solid production".

Charts

Certifications

Release history

References

2022 singles
2022 songs
Chris Brown songs
Wizkid songs
Songs written by Chris Brown
Songs written by Wizkid